Rafael Rodríguez (born September 24, 1984) is a Dominican Republic former pitcher.

Career
Rodríguez made his major league debut with the Los Angeles Angels of Anaheim against the Seattle Mariners on April 15, at Safeco Field, pitching one inning and giving up one hit.

On July 25, 2010, he was traded by the Angels to the Arizona Diamondbacks as part of deal for Dan Haren. He was designated for assignment following the 2010 season.

References

External links

1984 births
Living people
Arkansas Travelers players
Arizona Diamondbacks players
Arizona League Angels players
Cedar Rapids Kernels players
Dominican Republic expatriate baseball players in Mexico
Dominican Republic expatriate baseball players in the United States

Los Angeles Angels players
Major League Baseball pitchers
Major League Baseball players from the Dominican Republic
Mexican League baseball pitchers
Provo Angels players
Rancho Cucamonga Quakes players
Reno Aces players
Salt Lake Bees players
Saraperos de Saltillo players